Roibeard Ó Maolalaigh is Professor of Gaelic and Vice Principal and Head of the College of Arts / Colaiste nan Ealain at the University of Glasgow. He was born in 1966 in Dublin, Ireland.

Career
He earned a BA Hons and an MA from University College Dublin in Irish and Mathematics. Subsequently he was awarded a scholarship to study Scottish Gaelic phonology at the University of Edinburgh, where he completed a PhD on Gaelic historical phonology. He lectured at the University of Edinburgh from 1993 to 2001, where he set up Ionad na Gaeilge ("the Centre for Irish Studies"). He was assistant professor at the School of Celtic Studies, Dublin Institute for Advanced Studies, between 2001 and 2004 before returning to Scotland in 2005 to take up an endowed chair in Gaelic at the Department of Celtic and Gaelic, University of Glasgow, 2005-10.

He was appointed to the first ever established Chair of Gaelic in Scotland at the University of Glasgow in 2010.

At the University of Glasgow, he has held the following positions: Head of Celtic and Gaelic, 2007–10; Deputy head of the School of Humanities / Sgoil nan Daonnachdan, 2010–11; head of the School of Humanities / Sgoil nan Daonnachdan, 2012–14; Vice Principal and Head of the College of Arts / Colaiste nan Ealain, from 2015 onwards.

He is Director of the British Academy-funded project, Digital Archive of Scottish Gaelic / Dachaigh airson Storas na Gaidhlig, which includes Corpas na Gaidhlig.

In March 2022 he was elected a Fellow of the Royal Society of Edinburgh.

Research
His research work focusses on Scottish Gaelic, in particular its dialectology, history, terminology and phonology.

Publications
He has published widely, both papers and books, such as:
 Scottish Gaelic in Three Months/Scottish Gaelic in Twelve Weeks (1998)

Sources

Scottish Gaelic language
1966 births
21st-century linguists
Alumni of the University of Edinburgh
Academics of the University of Edinburgh
Linguists from the Republic of Ireland
Linguists of Irish
Living people
Irish-language writers
Academics of the University of Glasgow
Academics of the Dublin Institute for Advanced Studies
Fellows of the Royal Society of Edinburgh